Wellsford (Māori: Whakapirau) is a town on the Northland Peninsula in the northern North Island of New Zealand. It is the northernmost major settlement in the Auckland Region, and is 77 kilometres northwest of the Auckland CBD.

Wellsford is close to a narrowing of the Northland Peninsula caused by an arm of the Kaipara Harbour on the west coast extending inland for 20 kilometres from the body of the harbour, stretching to within 15 kilometres of the east (Pacific Ocean) coast.

It is a major regional centre, being located at the junction of State Highways 1 and 16, almost halfway between Auckland and the Northland city of Whangārei. It is on the North Auckland Line railway, which has been goods-only since the last regular passenger service ceased in 1975. It is the rural service town for the local areas of Tauhoa, Tapora, Wharehine, Port Albert, Te Hana, Tomarata, Te Arai, Whangaripo and Pakiri.

The local Ōruawharo Marae is a traditional meeting ground for Te Uri o Hau and the Ngāti Whātua hapū of Ngāti Mauku and Ngāti Tahuhu. It includes the Rangimārie meeting house.

Albertland Heritage Museum is located in Wellsford. It opened in its modern form in 1990.

History

In the early 1860s English settlers arrived, establishing themselves at Port Albert, on the Kaipara Coast about 10 kilometres west of Wellsford. These settlers called themselves the Albertlanders, after Prince Albert, Queen Victoria's consort. They were a "breakaway group from the Anglican Church looking for a new world".
However, not many of the settlers arrived at Port Albert and the ones who did found it difficult to make a living. The majority of the Albertlanders moved inland, to more fertile areas in the region. As a result, Wellsford was founded.

According to local tradition, the name Wellsford is an acronym based on the surnames of the first families who settled in the region. The names were Watson, Edger, Lester, Levet, Simpson, Foster, Oldfield, Ramsbottom and Dibble.

Wellsford was part of the Rodney District during its existence from 1989 to 2010.

Demographics
Wellsford is described by Statistics New Zealand as a small urban area.

Wellsford had a population of 1,929 at the 2018 New Zealand census, an increase of 216 people (12.6%) since the 2013 census, and an increase of 258 people (15.4%) since the 2006 census. There were 654 households, comprising 984 males and 948 females, giving a sex ratio of 1.04 males per female. The median age was 34.4 years (compared with 37.4 years nationally), with 447 people (23.2%) aged under 15 years, 384 (19.9%) aged 15 to 29, 777 (40.3%) aged 30 to 64, and 327 (17.0%) aged 65 or older.

Ethnicities were 79.5% European/Pākehā, 24.4% Māori, 5.3% Pacific peoples, 6.1% Asian, and 1.7% other ethnicities. People may identify with more than one ethnicity.

The percentage of people born overseas was 17.3, compared with 27.1% nationally.

Although some people chose not to answer the census's question about religious affiliation, 50.4% had no religion, 36.5% were Christian, 3.0% had Māori religious beliefs, 1.1% were Hindu, 0.2% were Muslim, 0.8% were Buddhist and 1.4% had other religions.

Of those at least 15 years old, 135 (9.1%) people had a bachelor's or higher degree, and 381 (25.7%) people had no formal qualifications. The median income was $25,400, compared with $31,800 nationally. 138 people (9.3%) earned over $70,000 compared to 17.2% nationally. The employment status of those at least 15 was that 681 (46.0%) people were employed full-time, 213 (14.4%) were part-time, and 66 (4.5%) were unemployed.

Education

Rodney College is a secondary (years 9-13) school with a roll of  students. Wellsford School is a full primary (years 1–8) school with a roll of  students. Rodney College's Board of Trustees was dismissed in August 2008 and a Ministry of Education commissioner appointed. By 2016, the college was performing well.

Living Way Christian School closed at the end of 2018 due to falling rolls.

Wellsford, Tauhoa, Pakiri, Tapora, Tomarata and Mangawhai Primary Schools all cater for students from year 1–8, and collectively contribute to the annual in take of roughly 80 year 9 students at Rodney College.

All the schools are coeducational. Rolls are as of

Sport 
Being a rural town, sport plays a big part in Wellsford's day-to-day life with rugby, soccer, netball, cricket, tennis and athletics being amongst the more popular sports played. The Wellsford Golf Club is popular among the locals and also houses squash courts. Rollerskating, archery and bowling, (indoors and outdoors) are also available, while equestrian is also popular in the area.

References

External links

 Official Wellsford and areas community website
 Visit Wellsford website
 Albertland Museum website
 Rodney College website
 Wellsford School website

Rodney Local Board Area
Populated places in the Auckland Region